Béguédo is a small department or commune of Boulgou Province in eastern Burkina Faso. Its capital lies at the town of Béguédo. According to the 2019 census the department has a total population of 28,094.

Towns and villages
 Béguédo (14 692 inhabitants) (capital)
 Beguedo Peulh (675 inhabitants) 
 Diarra (395 inhabitants) 
 Fingla (2 118 inhabitants)

References

Departments of Burkina Faso
Boulgou Province